Phillip Boykin (sometimes credited as Phillip Lamar Boykin) (born November 2, 1968) is an American bass-baritone, broadway, gospel, jazz and opera singer, film and stage actor.

Early life
One of ten children, Boykin grew up in Greenville, South Carolina. He started studies in Opera Performance at South Carolina State College before transferring to the North Carolina School of the Arts. He left NCSA in 1990 and moved to the Hartt School of the University of Hartford where he received his Bachelor of Music in Vocal Performance in 1995. He later studied toward a Master's degree in Opera and Jazz Vocals from Howard University.

He received the 2015 Hartt Alumni Award from The Hartt School.

Career
Boykin was nominated for the Tony Award, as well as the Drama Desk and Outer Critics Circle Award for Outstanding Featured Actor in a Musical for his role as Crown in the Broadway revival of Porgy and Bess (2012). He was awarded the Theater World Award for his Outstanding Broadway debut.

Boykin was also featured in On the Town which ran on Broadway at the Lyric Theatre in 2014-2015. In 2017 he was featured in the Broadway revival of Sunday in the Park with George. He made Broadway history as the first African-American Boatman/Lee Randolph in the production, which reopened Broadway's newest and oldest theater at the time, the Hudson Theatre, which played its last Broadway show in 1968. Boykin played the role of Tonton Julian in the Revival of Once on This Island, which opened on Broadway at the Circle in the Square Theatre on December 3, 2017 and closed on January 6, 2019.

He is the founder and director of "The NYGospel Brothers", a gospel quartet that travels around the world spreading the good news.

He was seen in the films Freedom (2014) starring Cuba Gooding Jr., Top Five (2014) starring Chris Rock, and Easter Mysteries an oratorio-musical written by John O’Boyle.

In 2019, he was inducted into the South Carolina Theatre Association Hall of Fame following a performance of the Once on this Island tour in his hometown of Greenville, South Carolina.

Awards and nominations

References

External links

American male musical theatre actors
Living people
University of Hartford alumni
University of Hartford Hartt School alumni
Theatre World Award winners
1968 births